The list of ship launches in 1956 includes a chronological list of all ships launched in 1956.


References

1956
Ship launches
 
Ship